Diana Ferrus (born 29 August 1953, Worcester, Western Cape) is a South African writer and storyteller of mixed Khoisan and slave ancestry. Her work is published in Afrikaans and English. Ferrus leads writing workshops in Cape Town while working as an administrator at the University of the Western Cape.

Ferrus is best known for her poem about Sarah Baartman, a South African woman taken to Europe under false pretenses and paraded as a curiosity. She wrote the poem in 1998 while studying at Utrecht University. The popularity of this poem is widely believed to be responsible for the return of Bartmann's remains to South Africa. The poem was published into a French law.

Ferrus is a founder of the Afrikaans Skrywersvereniging (ASV), Bush Poets, and Women in Xchains. She has a publishing company called Diana Ferrus Publishers and has co-edited and published a collection of stories about fathers and daughters.

References

External links
Official website

1953 births
Living people
People from Worcester, South Africa
Cape Coloureds
South African women poets
University of the Western Cape alumni
Academic staff of the University of the Western Cape
Utrecht University alumni